Tom Tierney may refer to:
 Tom Tierney (rugby union), Irish rugby union footballer
 Tom Tierney (artist) (1925–2014), American paper doll artist
 Tom Tierney (hurler) (1894–1984), Irish hurler